Karl Storck  (1826–1887) was a Hessian-born Romanian sculptor and art theorist.

Biography
Karl Storck was born on in Hanau, Grand Duchy of Hesse. Having been trained and working for a time as an engraver, he became sculptor only later. He studied in Paris, from where he was driven out by the French Revolution of 1848. He settled in Bucharest in 1849, and spent the years 1856–1857 in Munich where he trained as sculptor. In 1865 he became the first professor of sculpture at the Fine Arts Academy in Bucharest, becoming the most prominent figure and main developer in this early period of modern Romanian sculpture.

His sons, Carol Storck (1854–1926) and Frederic Storck (1872–1924), were also noted artists.

Notable students

 Dimitrie Paciurea
 George Julian Zolnay

List of works

Sculptures and monuments
 Domniţa Bălaşa, Spătarul Mihail Cantacuzino
 Statue of Carol Davila
 Minerva încununând artele și știința
 The iconostasis of Viforata Monastery (15th century)
 Bas-reliefs on the facade of the University of Bucharest (destroyed by the Allied bombing of Bucharest in World War II)
 Facade and interior of the

Portraits
 Bust of Grigore III Ghica of Moldavia, in Iași
 Busts of Theodor Aman, Alexandru Ioan Cuza, Mihail Kogălniceanu, C. A. Rosetti, Elena Cuza

See also
 Frederic and Cecilia Cuțescu-Storck Art Museum

Notes

References

External links

  Bildhauerei

Further reading
Marin Mihalache, Sculptorii Storck ("The Storck Sculptors"), Editura Meridiane, Bucharest, 1975, LCCN: 75409215, LC:	NB933.S83 M54

1826 births
1887 deaths
Romanian sculptors
Romanian people of German descent
People from Hanau
19th-century sculptors
Academic staff of the Bucharest National University of Arts